This is a list of primary and secondary schools in Cyprus.  Tertiary schools are maintained at the List of universities and colleges in Cyprus.

Republic of Cyprus
Schools in the Cyprus (officially the Republic of Cyprus) include:

 American Academy of Larnaca
Aradippou High School
 American International School in Cyprus
 Archbishop Makarios III Lyceum
 Falcon School Cyprus
 Faneromeni School
 TLC Private School, Paphos
 International School of Paphos
 King Richard School, Cyprus
 Larnaca Armenian School
 Limassol Armenian School
 Melkonian Educational Institute
 Nicosia Armenian School
 Pancyprian Gymnasium
 St. Athanasius – Linopetra Lyceum
 St. John's School
 Terra Santa College
 The English School, Nicosia
 The Heritage Private School
 Xenion High School
 The Russian School of Paphos

Northern Cyprus
Schools in the Northern Cyprus (officially, the Turkish Republic of Northern Cyprus) include:

 Necat British College, Kyrenia 
 Necat British College, Nicosia
 Necat British Preschool, Nicosia 
 The English School of Kyrenia
 Famagusta Namık Kemal High School
 Rizokarpaso Primary School
 Türk Maarif Koleji
 Nicosia Turkish High School

See also

 Education in Cyprus
 Lists of schools

External links

Schools
Schools
Schools
Cyprus
Cyprus
Cyprus